The 2014 USL Pro season was the fourth USL Pro season and the 28th season of third-division soccer in the United States.

Teams 

Antigua Barracuda FC and VSI Tampa Bay FC folded following the 2013 season and were replaced by Sacramento Republic FC and Oklahoma City Energy FC. On January 29, 2014, the Los Angeles Galaxy of MLS announced that they would be fielding a USL Pro team, the LA Galaxy II. The Los Angeles Blues were rebranded Orange County Blues FC on February 5, 2014. Arizona United SC replaced Phoenix FC on March 13, 2014.

Orlando City Soccer Club spent their final season in USL Pro playing at ESPN Wide World of Sports Complex on the campus of Walt Disney World Resort in Kissimmee, Florida. This is due to the closure of the Florida Citrus Bowl Stadium, their home for their first three seasons, for remodeling during 2014. The following season Orlando City moved up to Major League Soccer.

Stadiums and Locations

Personnel and kits 

Note: Flags indicate national team as has been defined under FIFA eligibility rules. Players may hold more than one non-FIFA nationality.

MLS-USL Pro Alliance 

Each USL PRO team will compete in two additional inter-league games against 2014 MLS Reserve League opponents in a "geographically influenced unbalanced schedule".  The inter-league games will count in both the official USL PRO and MLS Reserve League standings.

The following teams will affiliate:

 Columbus Crew — Dayton Dutch Lions
 D.C. United — Richmond Kickers
 Houston Dynamo — Pittsburgh Riverhounds
 Los Angeles Galaxy — Los Angeles Galaxy II
 New England Revolution — Rochester Rhinos
 Philadelphia Union — Harrisburg City Islanders
 Portland Timbers — Sacramento Republic FC
 San Jose Earthquakes — Sacramento Republic FC
 Sporting Kansas City — Orlando City & Oklahoma City
 Toronto FC — Wilmington Hammerheads
 Vancouver Whitecaps — Charleston Battery

USL Pro teams compiled a 14 Win, 5 Tie and 9 Loss record against MLS Reserve Teams in 2014.

Player transfers 

For full article, see List of USL Pro transfers 2014.

Managerial changes

League table

Results table 

USL Pro published schedule and results.

Playoffs 

The 2014 USL Pro Playoffs included the top eight finishers in the table, with the quarterfinals (No. 1 vs. No. 8, No. 2 vs. No. 7, etc.) set for the weekend of September 12–14. The semifinals featuring the four remaining teams will be played the following weekend, with the 2014 USL PRO Championship set for the weekend of September 26–28. All playoff rounds feature a single-game knockout format and teams will not be re-seeded following each round.

Championship Game MVP: Rodrigo López (SAC)

Statistical leaders

Top scorers 

Source:

Top assists 

Source:

|}

Top Goalkeepers 

(Minimum of 1080 Minutes Played)

Source:

League Awards 

 Most Valuable Player: Kevin Molino (ORL)
 Rookie of the Year: John McCarthy (ROC)
 Defender of the Year: Nemanja Vuković (SAC)
 Goalkeeper of the Year: John McCarthy (ROC)
 Coach of the Year: Preki  (SAC)

All-League Teams

First Team 

F: Matthew Delicâte (RIC), Chandler Hoffman (LAG), Dane Kelly (CHB)
M: George Davis IV (RIC), Rodrigo López (SAC),  Kevin Molino (ORL)
D: Luke Boden (ORL), Ashani Fairclough (WIL),  Nemanja Vuković (SAC), William Yomby (RIC)
G: John McCarthy (ROC)

Second Team 

F: J.C. Banks (ROC), Aaron Schoenfeld (DDL), Long Tan (AZU)
M: André Auras (LAG), Jorge Herrera (CHE), Allan Russell (OCB)
D: Matt Bahner (HAR), Gareth Evans (OKC),  Brad Rusin (ORL), Daniel Steres (LAG)
G: Joe Willis (RIC)

References 

 
2013
3